Kelly Haag (born 6 October 1970) is an English former professional footballer who played as a forward in the Football League for Barnet, Fulham and Brentford.

Personal life 
Haag's son Harley also became a footballer.

Career statistics

References

External links
 
 Profile at NonLeagueDaily

1970 births
Living people
Footballers from Enfield, London
English footballers
Association football forwards
Brentford F.C. players
Fulham F.C. players
Barnet F.C. players
Sutton United F.C. players
Woking F.C. players
Dagenham & Redbridge F.C. players
Stevenage F.C. players
St Albans City F.C. players
Baldock Town F.C. players
Aylesbury United F.C. players
Dover Athletic F.C. players
Fisher Athletic F.C. players
Ware F.C. players
National League (English football) players
English Football League players